The 2014 Presbyterian Blue Hose football team represented Presbyterian College in the 2014 NCAA Division I FCS football season. They were led by sixth-year head coach Harold Nichols and played their home games at Bailey Memorial Stadium. They were a member of the Big South Conference. They finished the season 6–5, 3–2 in Big South play, to finish in a tie for third place.

Schedule

Source: Schedule

References

Presbyterian
Presbyterian Blue Hose football seasons
Presbyterian Blue Hose football